Studio Nue, Inc. is a Japanese design studio formed in 1972 (as Crystal Art Studio) by Naoyuki Kato, Kenichi Matsuzaki, Kazutaka Miyatake, and Haruka Takachiho. Crystal Art Studio would change their name to Studio Nue in 1974.

They were known as the co-creators of the Macross franchise along with Artland (co-production of the first series) and Big West Advertising (financial funding).

Shōji Kawamori is a notable member of Studio Nue.

Filmography
Aero Troopers
Zero Tester
Chogattai Majutsu Robot Ginguiser
Chōdenji Robo Combattler V
Chōdenji Machine Voltes V
Space Battleship Yamato
Space Battleship Yamato II
Arcadia of My Youth
Techno Police 21C
The Super Dimension Fortress Macross
Crusher Joe
Dirty Pair
Super Dimension Century Orguss
Macross: Do You Remember Love?
The Super Dimension Fortress Macross: Flash Back 2012
Macross Plus
Macross 7
Macross Dynamite 7
Macross Zero
Macross Frontier
Armored Core series
Infinite Space
Macross Delta
Space Genie Daikengo

References

External links
Studio Nue profile at ZincPanic.com
 

Animation studios in Tokyo
Mass media companies based in Tokyo
Mass media companies established in 1972
Japanese companies established in 1972
Macross